The 2022 Southwark London Borough Council election took place on 5 May 2022. All 63 members of Southwark London Borough Council were elected. The elections took place alongside local elections in the other London boroughs and elections to local authorities across the United Kingdom.

In the previous election in 2018, the Labour Party maintained its control of the council, winning 49 out of the 63 seats with the Liberal Democrats forming the council opposition with the remaining 14 seats. 

Labour kept control in 2022, taking 3 seats from the Liberal Democrats in London Bridge and West Bermondsey and increasing their majority to 52.

Background

History 
The thirty-two London boroughs were established in 1965 by the London Government Act 1963. They are the principal authorities in Greater London and have responsibilities including education, housing, planning, highways, social services, libraries, recreation, waste, environmental health and revenue collection. Some powers are shared with the Greater London Authority, which also manages passenger transport, police, and fire.

Since its formation, Southwark has been continuously under Labour control, apart from a period of no overall control from 2002 to 2010. Apart from an independent in 1982 and a Green Party councillor in 2006, all councillors have been from the Labour Party, Liberal Democrats or the Conservative Party. Labour regained its majority in the 2010 election, winning 35 seats with the Liberal Democrats on 25 and the Conservatives on three. Labour extended its majority by winning 48 seats in the 2014 election with the Liberal Democrats on 13 seats and the Conservatives on two. The Conservatives lost all their representation in the most recent election in 2018, with Labour winning 49 seats with 55.3% of the vote across the borough and the Liberal Democrats winning the remaining 14 seats with 23.9% of the vote. The Green Party received 10.5% of the vote and the Conservatives received 10.4% of the vote but neither party won any seats. The incumbent council leader, Peter John, was reappointed following the election.

Council term 

The Labour councillor Kieron Williams was elected as the leader of the council in September 2020, succeeding Peter John.

Electoral process 
Southwark, like other London borough councils, elects all of its councillors at once every four years. The previous election took place in 2018. The election took place by multi-member first-past-the-post voting, with each ward being represented by two or three councillors. Electors had as many votes as there are councillors to be elected in their ward, with the top two or three being elected.

All registered electors (British, Irish, Commonwealth and European Union citizens) living in London aged 18 or over were entitled to vote in the election. People who lived at two addresses in different councils, such as university students with different term-time and holiday addresses, were entitled to be registered for and vote in elections in both local authorities. Voting in-person at polling stations took place from 7:00 to 22:00 on election day, and voters were able to apply for postal votes or proxy votes in advance of the election.

Previous council composition

Results summary

Ward Results

Borough & Bankside

Camberwell Green

Champion Hill

Chaucer

Dulwich Hill

Dulwich Village

Dulwich Wood

Faraday

David Noakes was a sitting councillor for Borough & Bankside.

Goose Green

London Bridge & West Bermondsey

Sunil Chopra was a sitting councillor for Nunhead & Queen's Road.

Newington

North Bermondsey

Sirajul Islam was a sitting councillor for Chaucer.

North Walworth

Nunhead & Queen's Road

Old Kent Road

Peckham

Peckham Rye

Rotherhithe

Rye Lane

South Bermondsey

St George's

St Giles

Surrey Docks

References 

Council elections in the London Borough of Southwark
Southwark